Stunt Copter is a monochrome Macintosh action game written by Duane Blehm and published by his Kansas-based company, HomeTown Software, in 1986. Blehm's other games include Cairo Shootout, ZeroGravity, and PUZZ'L. He died unexpectedly in June 1988.

Gameplay
The game involves piloting a small helicopter around a playfield. The player has to position the helicopter and drop a person suspended from the aircraft onto a hay bale or moving cart. If incorrectly timed, the person might fall onto the ground or injure the horse or the driver of the cart.

Legacy
After his death, his parents released his games and source code into the public domain.

MacAddict magazine used Stunt Copter to demonstrate software compatibility of Mac OS X public beta. An OS X version was released by Antell Software.

An iPhone version was released by nerdgames in 2009. In 2011, an iPad version of Stunt Copter was released by Apollo Software which is similar to the original.

In 2018, a collection of his games were uploaded to the Internet Archive and made playable in a web browser.

References

Helicopter video games
iOS games
Classic Mac OS games
Video games developed in the United States
1986 video games
Public-domain software with source code
Commercial video games with freely available source code